Nationality words link to articles with information on the nation's poetry or literature (for instance, Irish or France).

Events

Works published
 Lady Mary Chudleigh, Poems upon Several Occasions
 William Congreve, A Hymn to Harmony
 Daniel Defoe:
 A true collection of the writings of the author of the True Born English-man
 A Hymn to the Funeral Sermon, published anonymously, has been attributed to Defoe
 More Reformation: A satyr upon himself
 Sarah Fyge Egerton, Poems on Several Occasions, prefatory verses by Susanna Centlivre
 Bernard Mandeville, Some Fables After the Easie and Familiar Method of Monsieur de la Fontaine, published anonymously

Births
Death years link to the corresponding "[year] in poetry" article:
 March 5 (n. s.) – Vasily Kirillovich Trediakovsky (died 1768), Russian poet
 June 28 (n.s.) – John Wesley (died 1791), English cleric and Christian theologian, founder of Methodism, psalmist and hymnist
 October 2 – Fukuda Chiyo-ni, or Kaga no Chiyo, 千代尼 (died 1775), Japanese poet of the Edo period and a prominent haiku poet (a woman)
 Date unknown – Gilbert West (died 1756), English poet and translator
 Approximate date
 Samuel Boyse (died 1749), Irish poet
 Henry Brooke (died 1783), Irish poet, novelist and dramatist

Deaths
Birth years link to the corresponding "[year] in poetry" article:
 October 14 - Thomas Kingo (born 1634), Danish bishop, poet and hymn-writer

See also

Poetry
List of years in poetry
List of years in literature
 18th century in poetry
 18th century in literature

Notes

 "A Timeline of English Poetry" Web page of the Representative Poetry Online Web site, University of Toronto

18th-century poetry
Poetry